William Baker Kinne (March 22, 1874 – October 1, 1929) was a Republican politician from Idaho. He served as the 17th Lieutenant Governor of Idaho for eight months in 1929 during the administration of Governor H. C. Baldridge. He was a native of New Brunswick. He was kidnapped in June 1929 along with another occupant, however he managed to escape and inform the public about the incident, creating a manhunt for the suspects involved, who were eventually arrested, tried and imprisoned. Kinne died in office in September 1929 at Orofino, Idaho of peritonitis resulting from appendicitis and was succeeded by O. E. Hailey.

References

Idaho Republicans
Lieutenant Governors of Idaho
1874 births
1929 deaths
People from Orofino, Idaho